Maharaja Budhachandra (died 1955) was king of Manipur, India from 1941 to 1955.

He became King of Manipur in September 1941. He married the Nepali princess Ishori Devi. On 10 May 1942, Japan occupied Manipur. World War II bankrupted Manipur.

In October 1946, the king created the Manipur state congress to strengthen the economy. In January 1947, the king decided the country should become a constitutional monarchy. He designated a committee to plan this process. This plan was never completed.

On 15 August 1947, British India (which did not include Manipur) became independent. On 11 August 1947, Manipur signed an instrument of accession to the new Union of India. On 21 September 1949, the king went to Shillong to discuss constitutional matters with the state of India.

In 1949 India formally merged Manipur, but Maharaja Budhachandra remained as the constitutional head of the state government until his death in 1955. He was the last king of Manipur.

This article draws heavily on the :de:Budhachandra article in the German-language Wikipedia, which was accessed in the version of 31 March 2014.

Notes

Meitei royalty
Year of birth missing
1955 deaths